Presidential elections were held in Venezuela on 28 April 1941 to elect the successor of President of Venezuela Eleazar López Contreras. This presidential election, unlike the elections held since 1947, was indirect, that is, the voters were the deputies and senators of the Congress of Venezuela. The winner on this day was Isaías Medina Angarita with 120 votes, 87.6% of the seats in the Congress.

Background
Following the death of President Juan Vicente Gómez, who was dictator of Venezuela from 1908 to 1935, General and Minister of Army and Navy Eleazar López Contreras assumed the presidency. Eleazar López Contreras attempted to mediate between the authoritarian processes of his predecessor, promoting democratic processes and political freedom for Venezuelans.

In July 1936 shortly after becoming President of Venezuela, President Eleazar López Contreras created a constitutional amendment limiting the presidential term from seven years down to five, applying this law upon himself as well. This constitutional decision led to the 1941 elections, where the Congress of Venezuela would determine the new President of Venezuela.

Results

1941 in Venezuela
Venezuela
Elections in Venezuela
Presidential elections in Venezuela
Indirect elections
April 1941 events